Traveller Book 7: Merchant Prince is a 1985 role-playing game supplement for Traveller published by Game Designers' Workshop. Merchant Prince is a rulebook that details the merchant character class in four sections. Originally published in 1982 in a shorter form as Special Supplement 1, Merchant Prince in the Journal of the Travellers' Aid Society #12, by J. Andrew Keith.

Reception
Tony Watson reviewed Merchant Prince in The Space Gamer No. 76. Watson commented that "If your campaign is geared toward merchant characters, this volume is worth looking at. But if you are not particularly interested in brief descriptions of the major trading companies in the GDW universe, already have the new character generation system from the special supplement to JTAS, and are satisfied with the current rules for interstellar trade, Merchant Prince may not be of much use to you. If you are interested in any of these topics, then Book 7 of Traveller is just what you're looking for."

Reviews
 Different Worlds #45 (March/April, 1987)

References

See also
Classic Traveller Books

Role-playing game supplements introduced in 1985
Traveller (role-playing game) supplements